Agartha (sometimes Agartta, Agharti, Agarath, Agarta or Agarttha) is a legendary kingdom that is said to be located in the Earth's core, according to hollow Earth theory.

These terms or variations upon them may also be used to refer to:

Agharta, an album by Miles Davis named for the mythical city
Agharta, a manga series by Takaharu Matsumoto
Ergenekon (allegation), a Turkish coup trial also referred to as "Ergenekon/Agartha"
"Argatha", a song by the Sword from the album High Country